Thomas Birk (born 5 July 1988) is a German former professional footballer who played as a defender.

References

External links
 
 

1986 births
Living people
German footballers
Association football defenders
FC Energie Cottbus II players
FC Erzgebirge Aue players
Chemnitzer FC players
SV Elversberg players
SV Röchling Völklingen players
Racing FC Union Luxembourg players
2. Bundesliga players
3. Liga players
Regionalliga players
People from Wittenberg
Footballers from Saxony-Anhalt